M.K. Mohan is the incumbent Member of Legislative Assembly for the Anna Nagar Constituency, Chennai. He is a member of the Dravida Munnetra Kazhagam (DMK) political party of Tamil Nadu. He was the industrialist and former Councillor for Anna Nagar as well as a board member of Chennai Metro Water and trustee of the Pachaiyappa Trust.

Electoral performance

References

Politicians from Chennai
Dravida Munnetra Kazhagam politicians
Tamil people
Living people
Year of birth missing (living people)
Place of birth missing (living people)
Tamil Nadu MLAs 2021–2026
Tamil Nadu MLAs 2016–2021